is a railway station in Wakkanai, Hokkaidō, Japan.

Lines
Hokkaido Railway Company
Sōya Main Line

Overview
Yūchi Station has one side platform. Only local trains serve the station.

Gallery

Adjacent stations

References

Stations of Hokkaido Railway Company
Railway stations in Hokkaido Prefecture
Railway stations in Japan opened in 1924
Wakkanai, Hokkaido